Amblypneustes grandis is a species of sea urchin of the family Temnopleuridae. Their armour is covered with spines. It came from the genus Amblypneustes and lives in the sea. Amblypneustes grandis was first scientifically described in 1912 by Hubert Lyman Clark.

See also 
Amblypneustes elevatus'Amblypneustes formosusAmblypneustes leucoglobus''

References 

Amblypneustes
Animals described in 1912
Taxa named by Hubert Lyman Clark